The VAXserver was a family of minicomputers developed and manufactured by Digital Equipment Corporation (DEC) using processors implementing the VAX instruction set architecture (ISA). The VAXserver models were variants of various VAX-based computers which were configured to only run operating systems which were licensed for network server use and not interactive time-sharing use. This was accomplished with different CPU modules and firmware.

VAXserver models include:

 VAXserver 3000 – (Based on the MicroVAX)
 VAXserver 3100
 VAXserver 3300
 VAXserver 3400
 VAXserver 3500
 VAXserver 3600
 VAXserver 3602
 VAXserver 3800
 VAXserver 3900
 VAXserver 4000 – (Based on the VAX 4000)
 VAXserver 4000 Model 200 – KA660-BA CPU module
 VAXserver 4000 Model 300 – KA670-BA CPU module
 VAXserver 6000 – (Based on the VAX 6000)
 VAXserver 6000 Model 210
 VAXserver 6000 Model 220
 VAXserver 6000 Model 310
 VAXserver 6000 Model 320
 VAXserver 6000 Model 410
 VAXserver 6000 Model 420
 VAXserver 6000 Model 510
 VAXserver 6000 Model 520
 VAXserver 9000 – (Based on the VAX 9000)
 VAXserver 9000 Model 110
 VAXserver 9000 Model 3x0
 VAXserver 9000 Model 310/Model 310VP
 VAXserver 9000 Model 320/Model 320VP
 VAXserver 9000 Model 330/Model 330VP
 VAXserver 9000 Model 340/Model 340VP

References 

DEC minicomputers